Walker Township is a township in Schuylkill County, Pennsylvania, United States. The population was 994 at the 2020 census.

Geography
According to the United States Census Bureau, the township has a total area of 22.9 square miles (59.3 km), of which 22.8 square miles (59.1 km)  is land and 0.1 square mile (0.1 km)  (0.22%) is water.

Demographics

At the 2000 census there were 936 people, 361 households, and 283 families living in the township.  The population density was 41.0 people per square mile (15.8/km).  There were 383 housing units at an average density of 16.8/sq mi (6.5/km).  The racial makeup of the township was 99.47% White, 0.21% Asian, and 0.32% from two or more races. Hispanic or Latino of any race were 0.21%.

Of the 361 households 31.3% had children under the age of 18 living with them, 67.6% were married couples living together, 6.6% had a female householder with no husband present, and 21.6% were non-families. 18.6% of households were one person and 11.1% were one person aged 65 or older.  The average household size was 2.59 and the average family size was 2.95.

The age distribution was 23.4% under the age of 18, 7.6% from 18 to 24, 27.2% from 25 to 44, 24.1% from 45 to 64, and 17.6% 65 or older.  The median age was 41 years. For every 100 females, there were 100.9 males.  For every 100 females age 18 and over, there were 102.0 males.

The median household income was $44,167 and the median family income  was $51,146. Males had a median income of $32,981 versus $23,750 for females. The per capita income for the township was $18,608.  About 7.6% of families and 10.1% of the population were below the poverty line, including 22.2% of those under age 18 and 6.3% of those age 65 or over.

References

Townships in Schuylkill County, Pennsylvania
Townships in Pennsylvania